Salmo coruhensis is a species of trout, a freshwater salmonid fish. It lives in streams flowing into the Black Sea, in Turkey and possibly Georgia.

This fish is silvery in colour and can grow to 80 cm length. It lives in clear, flowing water, particularly in middle stretches of the main branches of rivers and streams. On the other hand, it is also found in short coastal streams. After spawning it moves to the sea but stays near the river mouths, or in the lower stretches of rivers. It migrates upstream to breed in October-November.

References 

coruhensis
Fish described in 2010